Ivan Lendl was the defending champion and was one of the finalists along with John McEnroe.

There was no result for the tournament due to rain.

Seeds
A champion seed is indicated in bold text while text in italics indicates the round in which that seed was eliminated.

  Ivan Lendl (Final)
  Jimmy Connors (first round)
  Pat Cash (second round)
  John McEnroe (Final)
  Tim Mayotte (second round)
  Brad Gilbert (quarterfinals)
  David Pate (third round)
  Scott Davis (third round)
  Johan Kriek (second round)
  Wally Masur (first round)
  Slobodan Živojinović (third round)
  Amos Mansdorf (third round)
  Paul Annacone (second round)
  Peter Doohan (second round)
  Christo van Rensburg (semifinals)
  Derrick Rostagno (first round)

Draw

Finals

 * Final unfinished due to weather. Ivan Lendl and John McEnroe both received  Runners-up finishes .

Top half

Section 1

Section 2

Bottom half

Section 3

Section 4

References
 1987 Volvo International Draw (Archived 2009-06-09)

Singles